Julio César Abatte is an Argentine former footballer who played as a midfielder for clubs in Chile. He was born in Mendoza.

Abatte was a key figure in Rangers de Talca's squad as they turned professional and achieved promotion to the Chilean top division. He scored a goal in the club's Chilean Primera División debut as Rangers won 4–3 against Club Deportivo Universidad Católica in May 1953.

Teams
  Ferrobadminton 1946-1948
  Universidad de Chile 1949-1951
  Rangers 1952-1953

References

 Profile at BDFA 

Possibly living people
Argentine expatriate footballers
Argentine footballers
Association football midfielders
Universidad de Chile footballers
Rangers de Talca footballers
Chilean Primera División players
Expatriate footballers in Chile
Year of birth missing (living people)
Sportspeople from Mendoza, Argentina